The Arminius Hotel is a historic hotel in Portland, Oregon, United States. It was built in 1904 by Otto Kleeman, and is on the National Register of Historic Places. The inscription A.D.U.G. stands for the Allgemeine Deutsche Unterstützungsgesellschaft (General German Aid Society) that constructed the building.

References

1904 establishments in Oregon
German-American culture in Portland, Oregon
Hotel buildings completed in 1904
Hotel buildings on the National Register of Historic Places in Portland, Oregon
Hotels established in 1904
Portland Historic Landmarks
Southwest Portland, Oregon